Tim Göransson (born 26 March 1988) is a Swedish former tennis player.

Biography
Göransson participated at the Junior Australian Open and the Junior French Open in 2006.

He made his ATP main draw singles debut, as a wild card at the 2007 Swedish Open where he lost in the first round to Carlos Berlocq. Göransson competed mainly on the ATP Challenger Tour and the Futures circuit and won one Futures title.

Göransson achieved a career-high singles ranking of World No. 495 in 2009. He is a brother of fellow tennis player André Göransson.

ITF Futures titles

Singles: (1)

References

External links 
 
 

1988 births
Living people
Swedish male tennis players
Sportspeople from Uppsala